The list of ship launches in 1904 includes a chronological list of some ships launched in 1904.

References 

Sources

1904
Ship launches